The National Aquaculture Act of 1980 (P.L. 96-362, as amended) is intended to promote and support the development of private aquaculture and to ensure coordination among the various federal agencies that have aquaculture programs and policies.  It provided for a national aquaculture policy, including a formal National Aquaculture Development Plan; established a Joint Subcommittee on Aquaculture on which officials of USDA, Commerce, the Interior, and nine other federal agencies sit; designated USDA as the lead agency for coordination; and authorized the National Aquaculture Information Center within the National Agricultural Library.

The S. 1650 legislation was passed by the 96th U.S. Congressional session and signed into law by the 39th President of the United States Jimmy Carter on September 26, 1980.

References

External links 
 
 
 

Aquaculture in the United States
United States Department of Agriculture
United States federal agriculture legislation
1980 in American law
96th United States Congress
1980 in the environment